Clegg Hoyt (December 10, 1910 – October 6, 1967) was an American film and television actor. He appeared in over 100 films and television programs, and was perhaps best known for his silent role as the Sportscaster's sidekick, George, in the 1963 film Son of Flubber, appearing in a scene with actor, comedian and game show panelist Paul Lynde. Hoyt also played the recurring role of Mac in 13 episodes of the American medical drama television series Dr. Kildare. He died in October 1967 of a stroke in Woodland Hills, California. Hoyt was buried in Babylon Cemetery.

Partial filmography 

 Jail Busters (1955) - Guard (uncredited)
 Mohawk (1956) - Wagon Driver (uncredited)
 Santiago (1956) - Dutch
 Fighting Trouble (1956) - McBride (uncredited)
 Rumble on the Docks (1956) - Captain (uncredited)
 The Brass Legend (1956) - Bartender
 The True Story of Jesse James (1957) - Tucker (uncredited)
 Rock All Night (1957) - Marty
 The Restless Breed (1957) - Spud (uncredited)
 The Unholy Wife (1957) - Locksmith (uncredited)
 Gun Fever (1957) - Kane
 Damn Citizen (1958) - Sheriff Lloyd
 How to Make a Monster (1958) - Actor in Pirate Costume (uncredited)
 Al Capone (1959) - Lefty (uncredited)
 Gangster Story (1959) - Caretaker at Country Club
 Cimarron (1960) - Great Gotch (uncredited)
 The Young Savages (1961) - Whitey (uncredited)
 The Outsider (1961) - Drunk (uncredited)
 13 West Street (1962) - Noddy
 Incident in an Alley (1962) - Jerry's Pool Hall Proprietor (uncredited)
 That Touch of Mink (1962) - Truck Driver at Unemployment Office (uncredited)
 Paradise Alley (1962) - Herb
 Pressure Point (1962) - Pete the Tavern Patron (uncredited)
 Son of Flubber (1963) - George
 Johnny Cool (1963) - Craps Player (uncredited)
 Seven Days in May (1964) - Diner Operator (uncredited)
 Advance to the Rear (1964) - Loafer (uncredited)
 The Great Race (1965) - Man in Saloon (uncredited)
 Chamber of Horrors (1966) - New Orleans Bartender (uncredited)
 The Swinger (1966) - Bum (uncredited)
 Return of the Gunfighter (1966) - Deputy Young (uncredited)
 The Born Losers (1967) - Mr. Carmody (uncredited)
 The Love-Ins (1967) - Policeman in Park (uncredited)
 In the Heat of the Night (1967) - Deputy (uncredited)
 The Counterfeit Killer (1968) - Attendant (uncredited)

References

External links 

Rotten Tomatoes profile

1910 births
1967 deaths
People from Norwalk, Connecticut
Male actors from Connecticut
American male film actors
American male television actors
20th-century American male actors
Western (genre) television actors
Burials in New York (state)